Chaske Spencer (pronounced Chess-Kay; born March 9, 1975) is an American actor. He is perhaps best known for his roles as Sam Uley in The Twilight Saga film series (2009–2012), Teddo in the acclaimed film Wild Indian, and for his recurring role as Deputy Billy Raven in the Cinemax original series Banshee.

Life and career
Spencer was born in Tahlequah, Oklahoma and grew up in Montana, as well as Kooskia, Lapwai, and Lewiston, Idaho. He has two younger sisters. His heritage includes Lakota, Nez Perce, Cherokee, Muscogee, French, and Dutch. He is Lakota Sioux, enrolled with the Fort Peck Assiniboine and Sioux Tribes of Montana through his mother. He graduated from Clearwater Valley High School in 1994, where he went by the name James Spencer. As a young teen, he started acting in productions at the Lewiston Civic Theater. Spencer attended college at Lewis–Clark State College for a year, and considered a career in photography. He eventually dropped out of Lewis–Clark State College to pursue his acting career.

Spencer did odd jobs while taking acting lessons from coaches David Gideon and Ed Kovens. He got a role in the 2002 film Skins, which then led to Dreamkeeper, and Into the West. 

During his teens, Spencer had struggles with substance abuse and alcoholism. He continued to drink heavily during his college years. He later developed an addiction to cocaine and heroin, and checked into rehab. While in rehab, Spencer stopped taking drugs. He nearly gave up on acting before his agent called him to audition for New Moon, the sequel to Twilight.

In 2009, Spencer played werewolf Sam Uley in New Moon, based on Stephenie Meyer's novel of the same name. He reprised his role in Eclipse, Breaking Dawn – Part 1, and Breaking Dawn – Part 2.

In 2015, Spencer was cast in the recurring role of Billy Raven in the Banshee TV series, after making his debut one year prior in the web series Banshee Origins.

Spencer was selected in 2021 to star alongside Emily Blunt in The English TV series, produced for Amazon Prime Video and BBC One.

Filmography

Awards and nominations

References

External links

Chaske Spencer - MIPtalk.com Interview

1975 births
Living people
Lakota people
People from Tahlequah, Oklahoma
American male film actors
American male television actors
American male voice actors
Native American male actors
Native American actors
People from Lewiston, Idaho
American people of Cherokee descent
American people of Dutch descent
American people of French descent
Fort Peck Assiniboine and Sioux Tribes people